Tambien es Rock is a studio album released on 1984 by Mexican singer Luis Miguel. All the track are covers mostly from songs by Elvis Presley.

Track listing

References 

Luis Miguel albums
1984 albums
EMI Records albums
Spanish-language albums